Spilosoma mediopunctata is a moth in the family Erebidae. It was described by Arnold Pagenstecher in 1903. It is found in Ethiopia and Somalia.

Description

Female
Head, thorax, and abdomen orange yellow; antennae black, except basal joint; abdomen with lateral series of black points and two small sublateral spots towards extremity. Forewing pale yellow; a subbasal black point in cell, points in upper and lower angles of cell and two beyond lower angle. Hindwing pale yellow with black discoidal spot.

Wingspan 28 mm.

References

Spilosoma mediopunctata at Markku Savela's Lepidoptera and Some Other Life Forms

Moths described in 1903
mediopunctata
Moths of Africa